Jane Frank was an American artist.

Jane Frank may also refer to:

Jane Harman (born 1945), married name Jane Frank, U.S. Representative
Jane Ring Frank, conductor